Never Give Up: The 20th Century Odyssey of Herbert Zipper is a 1995 short documentary film about Herbert Zipper. It was written, directed, and produced by Terry Sanders, with Freida Lee Mock co-producing. It was nominated for an Academy Award for Best Documentary Short at the 68th Academy Awards in 1996.

References

External links
Never Give Up: The 20th Century Odyssey of Herbert Zipper at the American Film Foundation

1995 films
1995 documentary films
English-language Canadian films
American short documentary films
Canadian short documentary films
American independent films
Films directed by Terry Sanders
Documentary films about classical music and musicians
Canadian independent films
Documentary films about the Holocaust
1990s short documentary films
1995 independent films
1990s English-language films
1990s American films
1990s Canadian films